Silver Shadow may refer to:
 Silver Shadow (song), a song by Atlantic Starr
 Silver Shadow Stakes, a horse race
 Rolls-Royce Silver Shadow, a car
 Silver Shadow (ship), operated by Silversea Cruises
 Legacy of the Silver Shadow, a 2002 Australian children's television series